The ASEAN cable system was a submarine telecommunications cable system linking Indonesia, Malaysia, Singapore, Thailand and the Philippines. It was completed in September 1983, but has since been decommissioned.

Construction
Construction was split into four sections. The first section, a  cable, was laid in 1978 with landing points at Currimao, Ilocos Norte in the Philippines and Katong, Singapore. The second section, laid in 1980, was a 572 nm cable from Ancol, Indonesia (near Jakarta) to Changi, Singapore. The third section, laid in 1983, was a 920 nm cable between Singapore, Malaysia and Thailand. The final section laid was from Thailand to the Philippines.

Capacity
The cable carried 1380 circuits which were allocated on the basis of ownership shares in the whole project.

References

 
 
 
 

ASEAN
Submarine communications cables in the Pacific Ocean
Submarine communications cables in the Indian Ocean
1983 establishments in Indonesia
1983 establishments in Malaysia
1983 establishments in Singapore
1983 establishments in Thailand
1983 establishments in the Philippines